"Smile 'n' Shine" is a song by Swedish artist Pandora. It was released in April 1997 as the second single from Pandora's third studio album Changes (1996). The song peaked at number 45 on the Swedish Singles Chart.

Track listing
CD Single
 "Smile N Shine" (UK Radio Mix)	- 3:25
 "Smile N Shine" (UK 12" Mix) - 4:46

CD Maxi
 "Smile N Shine" (UK Radio Mix)	- 3:25
 "Smile N Shine" (United Nations Mix) - 6:50
 "Smile N Shine" (UK 12" Mix) - 4:46
 "Smile N Shine" (United Nations Dub) - 7:33

Australian CD Maxi
 "Smile N Shine" (UK Radio Mix)	- 3:25
 "Smile N Shine" (United Nations Mix) - 6:50
 "Smile N Shine" (UK 12" Mix) - 4:46
 "Smile N Shine" (United Nations Dub) - 7:33
 "Smile N Shine" (Triad Mix) - 8:59
 "You'll Always Be The Love of My Life" (Original Version) - 4:00
 "You'll Always Be The Love of My Life" (Club Mix) - 5:32

Charts

References

1997 singles
1996 songs
Pandora (singer) songs
Universal Music Group singles